St Thomas the Apostle Rural, also known as St Thomas-by-Launceston is a civil parish in east Cornwall, England, United Kingdom. It is centred on the village of Tregadillett and is in the Registration District of Launceston.

The parish lies to the west of the town of Launceston. It is bounded to the east by Launceston St Mary Magdelene, to the south by South Petherwin, to the west by Trewen, and to the north by Egloskerry and St Stephen-by-Launceston. The population of the parish in the 2001 census was 815. The district falls within the Altarnun civil ward but at the 2011 Census the parish population had increased only slightly to 836.

In the 19th century, the parish of St Thomas the Apostle was split into rural and urban parts, the urban part being incorporated into Launceston. Thus the population in  the 1891 census is given as 352 (urban) and 924 (rural).

Gallery

Parish church
The original parish church, dedicated to St Thomas, is on the northern outskirts of the town of Launceston at  near the ruins of St Thomas's Priory and the River Kensey. It is largely of 15th century date, but the lower part of the tower is 14th century: interesting features include a Norman font and tympanum, and two wall paintings.

There is a Cornish cross in the churchyard, found when the church was rebuilt in 1869-70.

Tregadillett

Tregadillett is the largest settlement in the parish and is situated beside the A30 trunk road about 3 miles (5 km) west of Launceston. The village has a school, a pub and a post office which closed down.

References

Villages in Cornwall
Civil parishes in Cornwall
Launceston, Cornwall
Grade II* listed buildings in Cornwall
National Heritage List for England